Invisible Battalion is a documentary film by Ukrainian directors Alina Gorlova, Svitlana Lishchinska, and Iryna Tsilyk. The documentary is part of the Invisible Battalion social project and is about six Ukrainian women who were combatants in the Russo-Ukrainian War.

Release
Invisible Battalion premiered on 1+1 on 16 October 2017, then played at the Oscar Cinema in Kyiv on 24 November.

References

External links
 

Ukrainian documentary films
2017 in Ukraine
2017 documentary films